The Peddars Way is a long distance footpath that passes through Suffolk and Norfolk, England.

Route
The Peddars Way is 46 miles (74 km) long and follows the route of a Roman road. It has been suggested by more than one writer that it was not created by the Romans but was an  ancient trackway, a branch or extension of the Icknield Way, used and remodelled by the Romans. The name-type, which recurs in medieval records from other parts of East Anglia, derives from Middle English pedder, meaning an itinerant trader. It is first mentioned on a map of 1587 AD.

It is one of four long distance footpaths which, when combined, run from Lyme Regis to Hunstanton and are referred to as the Greater Ridgeway.  At Knettishall Heath the Peddars Way links with the Icknield Way Path for 110 miles south west to Ivinghoe Beacon in Buckinghamshire.

Guide and waymarks
A detailed 144-page guide, including 1:25 000 maps from the Ordnance Survey, and described south to north, is published in the series of National Trail Guides. The trail is very well marked with two general types of waymarker along the length of the route. At junctions there are signs marked ‘Peddars Way’ on plain wood fingerposts. Elsewhere white, yellow and green discs are used bearing the acorn sign used on such long-distance routes.

Public transport
The Peddars Way may be accessed by public transport.  There is a path linking the southern end, at Knettishall Heath, to the nearby Harling Road railway station.  Holme, at the northern end, has a regular bus service to King's Lynn and Hunstanton.  Holme also has a regular bus service to Sheringham.  Both King's Lynn and Sheringham allow onward connections using their regular rail services.

Folklore
The Peddars Way was traditionally supposed to be a haunt of the ghostly East Anglian hound Black Shuck.

Gallery

See also
Long-distance footpaths in the UK
Recreational walks in Norfolk
Castle Acre
Sheringham
Beeston Regis
River Heacham
North Pickenham
Slíghe Chualann

References

External links

 National Trails' Peddars Way/Norfolk Coast Path page

Footpaths in Norfolk
Archaeological sites in Norfolk
Roman roads in England
Long-distance footpaths in England